Gato negro dragón rojo (also stylised as: Gato negro◆dragón rojo) is the fifth studio album by the Spanish folk rock group Amaral. It was released in Spain in 2008. Recording and album mastering was completed on 25 April 2008. The album contains Juan Aguirre's first contribution as lead vocalist, on the track "Es sólo una canción".

Release
The album was released in four different editions:
 standard 2-disc album.
 2-disc album with an extended 40-page booklet.
 limited-edition boxset with 40-page booklet version and additional extras.
 USB memory stick with 19 songs, PDF booklet, and extras.

Track list
The first disc is named "Gato negro" (Black cat) and the second one "Dragón rojo" (Red dragon).

Gato negro (CD1)
 Kamikaze
 Tarde de domingo rara (Rare Sunday afternoon)
 La barrera del sonido (The sound barrier)
 Las chicas de mi barrio (The girls in my neighbourhood)
 Esta noche (Tonight)
 Las puertas del infierno (The gates of hell)
 Biarritz
 Gato negro (Black cat)
 Rock & Roll

Dragón rojo (CD2)
 Perdóname (Forgive me)
 Alerta (Alert)
 El blues de la generación perdida (Blues of the lost generation)
 De carne y hueso (Of flesh and blood)
 Dragón rojo (Red dragon)
 Es sólo una canción (It's only a song)
 El artista del alambre (The wire artist)
 Deprisa (Quickly)
 Doce palabras (Twelve words)
 Concorde

iTunes edition
 El artista del alambre (acoustic)

Trivia

The song "El artista del alambre" was inspired by the film Fuera de Carta and was featured on the soundtrack to the film.

Charts

References

2008 albums
Amaral (band) albums